René van der Wouden (born February 10, 1972) is a Dutch electronic musician.

Biography
René has been active in music since he was eight years old. He started having piano lessons in a classical sense and later he also had some lessons on the organ. As a child René quickly got fascinated by the organs and synthesizers he saw on TV every week in the Dutch music shows TopPop and Countdown. Also, his piano teacher of that time (in 1983) played a Roland Jupiter 6 synthesizer in a band. During a lesson this synthesizer stood next to the piano that remained untouched that day. Since 1987 the interest in electronic music started to grow immensely. The music of Jean Michel Jarre, Vangelis, Tangerine Dream and Jeff Wayne's War of the Worlds got his interest.

In 1993 René bought his first set of synthesizers like the Korg Poly800 and Yamaha DX7. During this period René started to compose and record many pieces of music. Also an expanse of more electronic instruments and recording-devices happened. Next to this expansion, René studied a lot of recordings of electronic music and was influenced by artists from the Innovative Communication label like: Mind over Matter, G.E.N.E., Software, Quiet Force, Megabyte and Double Fantasy.

During the years 1995 to 2003 René van der Wouden recorded a lot of electronic orientated works on Tascam, Fostex and Akai reel-to-reel recorders. Some of those tracks are released on albums released by AmbientLive records UK. In 2004 René started to prepare, compose and record the albums "Recreation" and "Pro Sequentia". The latter was released firstly.

Pro Sequentia, the debut CD, was released first on the German Syngate label on April 16, 2005. This is an album of electronic music inspired by Berlin School artists as Tangerine Dream and Klaus Schulze but also Jean-Michel Jarre. This album was received well by the audience and reviewers and led to the first performance on E-Live 2005. But because of different visions between Syngate and René, the latter left and formed his own electronic music label in May 2005 for releasing his music. The Pro Sequentia album has been well received all over the EM-scene. The music can be described as retro/Berliner Schule with contemporary elements. On this album analogue and digital synthesizers were used together will all the power and comfort of computers.

The concert at E-Live 2005 was the first concert of electronic music by Rene. This E-Live 2005 (an annual held festival of electronic music) sub-stage concert consisted of 3 sets. The first set was in the style of the Pro Sequentia album, the second set consisted of 2 tracks of ambient music and the last set/concert took place together with the most successful Dutch musician of electronic music today, Gert Emmens. The music was recorded for personal documentation and will not be released.

In 2006 the follow-up CD of Pro Sequentia was released on the September 21, 2006 as Alchemia. This CD is much more Berliner Schule/retro/sequencer based than Pro Sequentia and also contains the use of samples of "the EM-instrument", the Mellotron. The overall style of the music can be referred to what is called the "Golden Era" of electronic music. The theme of the CD is "Alchemy". For years René has been interested in this kind of philosophy.

On October 28, 2006 there was a special concert given by EL-KA, René van der Wouden & Syngate artists at the GASOMETER, Oberhausen in the afternoon from 1:00 pm to 5:00 pm. The inspiration for this concert was: "How can we sound like our favorite electronic music band Tangerine Dream in a unique setting and building?"

For 2007 there were no albums planned, although the "Universal Quiet" album was planned for the fall of 2007 but due to some personal reason this album was released on January 4, 2008. This album can be seen as a further seek into the Cosmos, therefore its title. It's also referring to the period of the 1970s and 1980s of electronic music. This album was a well received one by the critics of electronic music all over the world.

In September 2008 the album "Sequential Tourism" was released. This album is a mixture of styles of retro music and rhythms in 4 long tracks and one short one. Next to the use of analogue synthesizers like SE Moog, Yamaha CS50, Sequential Pro One and the Moog The Rogue, modern rhythm patterns were used to give the music an exploring mood.

December 2009 was the time right for the release of "Numerus Fixus", the album about the world's natural places and how they become more and more important to this highly polluted world. This album gained a lot of good reviews all over the electronic music scene worldwide. It's one of the most successful albums of the composer.

The year 2011 was the most busiest year of René van der Wouden. Several concerts were given in the Netherlands and in Germany. 3 releases of fine electronic music.

For 2012 there are no musical plans.

Discography

Studio albums
2005 Pro Sequentia
2006 Alchemia
2007 Recreation (originally from 2004)
2008 Universal Quiet
2008 Sequential Tourism
2008 Kaleidoscopic Surrealism
2009 Numerus Fixus
2010 Panorama
2011 Fixus Naturalis
2011 Soledad and Other Dreams
2011 Sequential Mixed Up, the best of Rene van der Wouden 2004–2011 (only as download)
2011 Zeppelins! There they go

Compilations

The Netherlands
2005 Groove Unlimited's E-dition No. 9 with "E-Lively"
2006 Groove Unlimited's E-dition No. 12 with "Set 3 E-Live"
2011 Groove Unlimited's DUTCH MASTERS with the track "The Zeppelin"

Germany
2005 Schwingungen auf CD No. 123 with "Shenzhen Morning" (previously unreleased)
2005 Schwingungen auf CD No. 124 with "Prosa 4"
2006 Schwingungen auf CD No. 138 with "The Alchemists"
2007 Schwingungen auf CD No. 141 with "The Alchemists Lounge" (previously unreleased)
2008 Schwingungen auf CD No. 155 with "Get Quieter"
2008 Schwingungen auf CD No. 161 with "The Sequential Tourists" en "Schallwende Rehearsal" (previously unreleased)
2009 Schwingungen auf CD No. 164 with "Holiday Hyve" (previously unreleased)

Performances

Live concerts

2005 E-Live 2005 Eindhoven at the Green Room during the day
2006 Gasometer Oberhausen with Hajo Liese and Till Kopper as EL-KA
2008 Schallwende 10th Anniversary at the Gruga Park Essen together with Ron Boots and 
2011 Schallwende Grill Party for the Schallwende Organisation on June 4, 2011
2011 Electronic Circus Summer Party at Winnies Garten, Hamm on July 2, 2011
2011 E-Live 2011 as supporting act of LOOM at the upper hall

References

External links
 René van der Wouden
 for purchasing digital legal downloads
 for purchasing digital legal downloads
 MySpace site of REWO Records
 MySpace site of Rene van der Wouden
 YouTube Rene van der Wouden Live at Electronic Circus Schwingungen Garten Part July 2nd 2011, full HD video
 YouTube Rene van der Wouden Live at E-Live 2011 full upperroom concert part 1
 YouTube Rene van der Wouden Live at E-Live 2011 full upperroom concert part 2
 YouTube Rene van der Wouden Live at E-Live 2011 full upperroom concert part 3
 YouTube Rene van der Wouden Live at E-Live 2011 full upperroom concert part 4
 YouTube The Concert at the Gasometer with EL-KA the longer clip
 YouTube The Concert at the Gasometer with EL-KA the short clip
 YouTube Live at the Gruga August 2008 part 1 with Remy and Ron Boots/Harold van der Heijden/Henri Peeters
 YouTube Live at the Gruga August 2008 part 2 with Remy and Ron Boots/Harold van der Heijden/Henri Peeters

Dutch electronic musicians
1972 births
Living people